The Amiga CD32 (stylized as Amiga CD32, code-named "Spellbound") is a 32-bit home video game console developed by Commodore and released in Europe, Australia, Canada, and Brazil. It was first announced at the Science Museum in London on July 16, 1993, and was released in September of the same year.

The CD32 is part of a family of Amiga computers and other hardware. It uses CD-ROM as its storage medium. It was based on Commodore's Advanced Graphics Architecture chipset, and is of similar specification to the Amiga 1200 personal computer. Using third party devices, it is possible to upgrade the CD32 with a keyboard, floppy drive, hard drive, RAM and mouse, turning it into the equivalent of an Amiga 1200. A hardware MPEG decompression module for playing Video CD was also released.

In the Christmas period following its launch, the CD32 accounted for 38% of all CD-ROM drive sales in the UK, exceeding sales of the Mega-CD; however, it was discontinued as Commodore went into bankruptcy.

Release 
Computer Gaming World reported in November 1993 that "a significant amount of software will be available immediately" for the console, based on the Amiga 1200. The magazine in January 1994 stated that "in spite of Commodore's earlier efforts to disguise the fact—the Amiga is a great gaming platform", but wondered if the company could successfully market the console in the US; "The CDTV fiasco certainly isn't reassuring. Will there be enough U.S. developers to make the investment worthwhile?"

The CD32 was released in Canada and Australia and was planned for release in the United States. Commodore stated that the console would launch in the United States in either late February or early March 1994, at the price of $399 with two pack-in games, Pinball Fantasies and Sleepwalker, as well as six separately sold launch games. A federal judge ordered an injunction against Commodore preventing them from importing anything into the United States. Commodore had built up CD32 inventory in their Philippine manufacturing facility for the United States launch, but, being unable to sell the consoles, they remained in the Philippines until the debts owed to the owners of the facility were settled. Commodore declared bankruptcy shortly afterwards, and the CD32 was never officially sold in the United States. However, imported models did come over the border from Canada, and many stores in the United States (primarily mail-order stores) imported units for domestic sale. During the long bankruptcy proceedings,  also provided some hardware components and software for the American market, including production of the MPEG Video Module, which was not officially released by Commodore International.

The CD32 was marketed on its box as "The World's First 32-bit CD Games Console". Although it was the first such machine released in Europe and North America, it was beaten to market by seven months by the FM Towns Marty, a console released exclusively in Japan. However, the CD32's 68EC020 processor has a 32-bit data bus both internally and externally, while the 386SX in the FM Towns Marty has a 16-bit data bus externally. However, because the CD32 shipped with 2MB of RAM shared between the chipset and the CPU, this meant the CPU was bottlenecked when accessing memory, similar to an A1200 operating without 32-bit "fast" (CPU dedicated) RAM.

Ultimately, Commodore was not able to meet demand for new units because of component supply problems. Sales of the CD32 in Europe were not enough to save Commodore, and the bankruptcy of Commodore International in April 1994 caused the CD32 to be discontinued only eight months after its debut.

Specifications

Accessories 
The CD32 can be enhanced using these devices:

ProModule, Paravision SX-1, DCE SX-32 (which optionally includes 68030 CPU) and Terrible Fire's TF328 and TF330 (which add 2.5" IDE, keyboard connector and 8Mb/64mb of Fastmem).

Those devices extend the capabilities of the Amiga CD32, allowing it to utilize hardware such as an external 3.5" floppy disk drive, hard disk and IBM PC keyboard (a CD32-branded keyboard was officially released however, which used the AUX port on the left of the machine). An Amiga CD32 can be turned into a de facto Amiga 1200 via the addition of third-party packages. The SX-1 appears to have been designed around Commodore's mechanical specs and not the actual production units – it did not fit very well and requires an internal "modification" to equip it properly. Consequently, the SX-1 can be jarred loose if the console is not handled gently. The upgraded SX-32 expansion pack (which included a 68030  processor) solves these problems.

Not wishing to repeat its earlier mistake of offering a way to turn a CD32 into an enhanced A1200 as it did with the A500-based CDTV, Commodore itself made no hardware available for that purpose. One of its last hardware designs, however, was an external CD-ROM drive for the A1200 that featured the CD32's Akiko chip, thus turning any A1200 into a CD32-compatible system. The only currently known surviving prototype of the CD1200 drive resides at the Retro Computer Museum in Leicester.

In addition to its own special controllers, the Amiga CD32 is also compatible with most 9-pin D-sub controllers from the '80s and '90s, including the Sega Mega Drive/Genesis controllers, Atari 2600 joysticks, Sega Master System controllers, and all Amiga/C64 joysticks, as well as Amiga mice and paddles.

CDs created for the CD32 conform to ISO 9660 level2 mode1, although the Rock Ridge and Joliet extensions are not compatible.

Software 

If the system is turned on without a CD, a splash screen with scrolling colours will appear and a tune will play. After this tune ends, the user can press the blue button on the game pad to enter a language selection menu. The user can also press the red button to access a menu where they can view the contents of the internal Flash ROM. Unlike most game consoles, this menu does not allow the user to delete items. Instead, the system will automatically overwrite the oldest entries when the memory runs out. The menu does, however, allow the user to "lock" files to prevent overwriting.

The CD32 launch bundle included two games: Diggers, a new game from Millennium Interactive, and Oscar, from Flair Software. A later pack includes the one-on-one fighting game Dangerous Streets, a move by Commodore that was met with derision by the press. Many reviewers had given Dangerous Streets terrible scores (Amiga Power rating it just 3%) and were surprised that with a slew of powerful rival consoles about to hit the market, Commodore would choose to show off the abilities of its machine with a poor game.

The CD32 is capable of running most of the titles developed for the Amiga CDTV multimedia device, but differences in CPU speed and Kickstart version prevent some of the earlier CDTV titles from running. Most of the games released for the CD32 are simply ports of games that were already available for Amiga computers. One benefit of this is that, when appropriate, many games retain the ability to use an Amiga mouse (in port 2) or Amiga keyboard (plugged into the AUX port).

Like all later Amiga computers, the CD32 has a hidden boot menu that can be accessed by plugging an Amiga mouse into port 2 and holding both buttons down while turning the system on. Most of the options in this menu are not useful on a CD32, but from this menu the user can choose to boot in either NTSC or PAL mode. This is important, as there are some games that will not work if the system is in the wrong mode, and most games don't advertise what video mode they were developed for.

Notable deployments 
In 1993, 109 CD32 units were installed to run the interactive exhibits at the London Transport Museum, Covent Garden. They provided information, animations, pictures, sound and text available in several languages, as well as a London Underground simulator. The systems were produced by the Odiham, Hampshire-based company Index Information, utilising their CD32x interface units.

In 1995, an Italian company named CD Express used the CD32 as a basis for an arcade machine called "CUBO CD32". Inside these machines, stock CD32s were hooked up to an external circuit board which essentially acted as a converter to route all the input and output into a standard JAMMA connector for use in an arcade cabinet. The software was provided on CD-ROM. Nine games are known to exist, all of which are original games created by CD Express.

In the mid to late 1990s, some vehicle registries in Canada utilised CD32 systems for interactive multimedia testing for drivers license applications.

In the late 1990s to early 2000s, slot machine manufacturer StarGames utilized a stripped down CD32 motherboard in many of their slot machines. Machines confirmed to be operating on CD32 hardware are Hawaiian Delight, Leprechaun Luck, and Mister Magic.

From 1994 to 1997, Sylvan Learning Systems used CD32 systems in their Wall Street Institute learning centres. Main features include software with voice tone recognition and interactive activities very focused on listening. Those consoles have a floppy disk drive unit attached, with a clock unit, for saving students' progress and sharing them with teachers. Data was stored in a central database and the system offered an advanced multimedia environment with statistics. It was replaced with PC systems after some years of intensive use and a very strong stock of spare consoles and pieces.

In 1995, Taurus Ventures Inc in Burnaby, BC developed the VanCity Direct TV system based on the CD32 for the VanCity Credit Union. It features a custom modem, also designed by TVi.

See also 

 Commodore CDTV
 Commodore 64 Games System
 Amiga models and variants

References

External links 

 amigacd32.com: Project CD32: Amiga CD32 database
 amiga.resource.cx: Amiga hardware database - Commodore CD32
 bigbookofamigahardware.com: CD32 - Commodore
 voxelarcade.com: List of some of the best CD32 games

Amiga
CD-ROM-based consoles
Home video game consoles
Fifth-generation video game consoles
68k-based game consoles